Saraj ol Din (also Romanized as Sarāj od Dīn) is a village in Gazin Rural District, Raghiveh District, Haftgel County, Khuzestan Province, Iran.

Population
At the 2006 census, its population was 60, in 8 families.

References 

Populated places in Haftkel County